Estropipate, also known as piperazine estrone sulfate and sold under the brand names Harmogen, Improvera, Ogen, Ortho-Est, and Sulestrex among others, is an estrogen medication which is used mainly in menopausal hormone therapy in the treatment of menopausal symptoms. It is a salt of estrone sulfate and piperazine, and is transformed into estrone and estradiol in the body. It is taken by mouth.

Medical uses
Estropipate is used to:

 Alleviate symptoms of menopause as menopausal hormone therapy
 Treat some types of infertility
 Treat some conditions leading to underdevelopment of female sexual characteristics
 Treat vaginal atrophy
 Treat some types of breast cancer (particularly in men and postmenopausal women)
 Treat prostate cancer
 Prevent osteoporosis

Available forms
Estropipate is available in the form of 0.75, 1.5, 3, and 6 mg oral tablets.

Pharmacology

Pharmacodynamics

Estropipate is a prodrug of estrone and estradiol. Hence, it is an estrogen, or an agonist of the estrogen receptors.

Pharmacokinetics

Estropipate is hydrolyzed into estrone in the body. Estrone can then be transformed into estradiol by 17β-hydroxysteroid dehydrogenase.

Chemistry

History
Estropipate was introduced for medical use by Abbott in 1968.

Society and culture

Generic names

Brand names
Estropipate is or has been marketed under the brand names Genoral, Harmogen, Improvera, Ogen, Ortho-Est, and Sulestrex among others.

Availability
Estropipate appears to remain available only in the United States. In the past, estropipate has also been marketed in Canada, the United Kingdom, Ireland, Switzerland, Australia, South Africa, Mexico, and Indonesia.

References 

Estranes
Estrone esters
Ketones
Piperazines
Sulfate esters
Salts
Synthetic estrogens